Farrash may refer to:
Fərraş, a village in Azerbaijan
Farrash, Kermanshah, a village in Kermanshah Province, Iran
Farrash, Iran, a city in Fars Province, Iran